Bolesław Lewandowski (5 June 1935 – 11 January 2003) was a Polish footballer. He played in one match for the Poland national football team in 1957.

References

External links
 

1935 births
2003 deaths
Polish footballers
Poland international footballers
Place of birth missing
Association footballers not categorized by position